Rodsley is a small village and civil parish about  south of Ashbourne in Derbyshire. As the population of the village was less than 100 at the 2011 Census, details are included in the civil parish of Yeaveley.

History
Nearby Hollington and Rodsley (then spelt Redeslei or Redlesleie) are included as manors in the 1086 Domesday Survey as belonging to Henry de Ferrers, who was given a large number of manors in Derbyshire. His descendants became the Earls of Derby and still owned land in Shirley in the nineteenth century. Mention is also made of the abbey of Burton as having an interest.

In 1881, Rodsley had a population of 136 people.

It has been calculated that in 1901, Rodsley represented the population centre of Britain. This centre has been travelling southwards through Longford (in 1911) and was lying somewhere near Appleby Parva on the Derbyshire to Leicestershire border in 2000.

Notable residents
Saint Ralph Sherwin was born here in 1550. He was canonised (declared a saint) in 1970 and his feast day is 1 December – the day he died in 1581.

See also
Listed buildings in Rodsley

Notes and references

External links

 1840 Tithe Map for Rodsley

Villages in Derbyshire
Civil parishes in Derbyshire
Towns and villages of the Peak District
Derbyshire Dales